Strait Area Education and Recreation Centre (SAERC) is a high school located in Port Hawkesbury, Nova Scotia, Canada.  It is attended by approximately 400 students in grades 9 to 12. The school is also home to a community swimming pool, as well as a public library, SAERC FM and SAERC TV. The school falls under the jurisdiction of the Strait Regional School Board.

Notable alumni
Lynn Coady
Mark Day
Allie MacDonald

References

External links
 Official website
 SAERC TV Website
 SAERC Student Handbook 2016 - 2017

High schools in Nova Scotia
Schools in Inverness County, Nova Scotia